Trudivske is a village in Volnovakha Raion (district) in Donetsk Oblast of eastern Ukraine, at 64.8 km SSW from the centre of Donetsk city.

The settlement was taken under control of pro-Russian forces during the War in Donbass, that started in 2014.

Demographics
In 2001 the settlement had 637 inhabitants. Native language as of the Ukrainian Census of 2001:
Ukrainian — 46.31%
Russian — 52.9%

References

Villages in Volnovakha Raion